Windows 3.0 is the third major release of Microsoft Windows, launched in 1990.  It features a new graphical user interface (GUI) where applications are represented as clickable icons, as opposed to the list of file names seen in its predecessors. Later updates would expand the software's capabilities, one of which added multimedia support for sound recording and playback, as well as support for CD-ROMs.

Windows 3.0 is the first version of Windows to perform well both critically and commercially. Critics and users considered its GUI to be a challenger to those of Apple Macintosh and Unix. Other praised features were the improved multitasking, customizability, and especially the utilitarian management of computer memory that troubled the users of Windows 3.0's predecessors. Microsoft was criticized by third-party developers for the bundling of its separate software with the operating environment, which they viewed as an anticompetitive practice. Windows 3.0 sold 10 million copies before it was succeeded by Windows 3.1 in 1992.

On December 31, 2001, Microsoft declared Windows 3.0 obsolete and stopped providing support and updates for the system.

Development history
Before Windows 3.0, Microsoft had a partnership with IBM, where the latter had sold personal computers running on the former's MS-DOS since 1981. Microsoft had made previous attempts to develop a successful operating environment called Windows, and IBM declined to include the project in its product line. As MS-DOS was entering its fifth iteration, IBM demanded a version of DOS that could run in "protected mode", which would allow it to execute multiple programs at once, among other benefits. MS-DOS was originally designed to run in real mode and run only one program at a time, due to the capability limitations of the Intel 8088 microprocessor. Intel had later released the Intel 80286, which was designed to support such multitasking efficiently (with several different hardware features, including memory protection, hardware task switching, program privilege separation, and virtual memory, all absent on the earlier Intel x86 CPUs) and which could be directly connected to 16 times as much memory as the 8088 (and 8086). The two companies developed the next generation of DOS, OS/2. OS/2 software was not compatible with DOS, giving IBM an advantage.

In late 1987, Windows/386 2.0 introduced a protected mode kernel that could multitask several DOS applications using virtual 8086 mode, but all Windows applications still ran in a shared virtual DOS machine. As the rest of the Microsoft team moved on to the OS/2 2.0 project, David Weise, a member of the Windows development team and a critic of IBM, believed that he could restart the Windows project. Microsoft needed programming tools that could run in protected mode, so it hired Murray Sargent, a physics professor from the University of Arizona who had developed a DOS extender and a debugging program that could work with protected mode applications. Windows 3.0 originated in 1988 as an independent project by Weise and Sargent, who used the latter's debugger to improve the memory manager and run Windows applications in their own separate protected memory segments. In a few months, Weiss and Sargent cobbled together a rough prototype that could run Windows versions of Word, Excel, and PowerPoint, then presented it to company executives, who were impressed enough to approve it as an official project. When IBM learned of Microsoft's upcoming project, their relationship was damaged, but Microsoft asserted that it would cancel Windows after its launch and that it would continue to develop OS/2.

Windows 3.0 was formally and officially announced on May 22, 1990, in the New York City Center Theater, where Microsoft released it worldwide. The event had 6,000 attendees, and it was broadcast live in the Microsoft social fairs of seven other North American cities and twelve major cities outside. It cost Microsoft  to host the festivities—something its founder, Bill Gates, referred to as the "most extravagant, extensive, and expensive software introduction ever." Microsoft decided not to offer free runtime licenses of the software to applications vendors, as runtime versions of Windows lacked the capacity to multitask. The software could also be obtained by purchasing computers with it preinstalled from hardware manufacturers. The first of these manufacturers were Zenith Data Systems, Austin Computer Systems and CompuAdd, followed by more than 25 others; notably, IBM was not one of them.

Microsoft had intended to make Windows 3.0 appealing to the public in general. The company's "Entry Team", assigned to that task, was concerned that the public might perceive it to be no more than a tool for large enterprises, due to the software's high system requirements. Major game publishers did not see it as a potential game platform, instead sticking to DOS. Microsoft's product manager Bruce Ryan compiled games that the Windows team had designed in its spare time to create Microsoft Entertainment Pack, which included Tetris and Minesweeper. There was little budget put in the project, and none of that was spent on quality testing. Nevertheless, the Entertainment Pack was sold as a separate product, and it became so popular that it was followed by three other Entertainment Packs.

On December 31, 2001, Microsoft dropped support for Windows 3.0, along with previous versions of Windows and Windows 95, Windows for Workgroups, and MS-DOS versions up to 6.22.

Features
Windows 3.0 features a significantly revamped graphical user interface (GUI), which was described as having a three-dimensional look similar to the Presentation Manager, rather than the flat look of its predecessor, Windows 2.1. It also includes technical improvements to the memory management to make better use of the capabilities of Intel's 80286 and 80386 processors. Dynamic Data Exchange is a multitasking protocol whereby multiple running applications dynamically exchange data with one another, i.e., when data in one application changes, so does the data in another. This feature had appeared in Windows previously, but until Windows 3.0, due to memory constraints, users were unable to use the protocol. These users instead had to exit to DOS to run one application, close it, and open another to exchange data. Due to its support for the 386 and later processors, Windows 3.0 can also use virtual memory, which is a portion of a hard disk drive that is substituted for memory by the processor in the event that its own memory is exhausted. Like its predecessors, Windows 3.0 is not an operating system per se, but rather an operating environment that is designed for DOS and controls its functions.

The MS-DOS Executive file manager was replaced with Program Manager, the list-based File Manager, and Task List. Program Manager is a graphical shell composed of icons, each with an underlying title. They can be moved and arranged in any order, and the icons' titles can be renamed. When double-clicked on, these icons open corresponding applications or smaller windows within the Program Manager window called group windows. These group windows contain such icons and can be minimized to prevent cluttering of the Program Manager window's space. File Manager is another shell used to access or modify applications, but displays them as files contained in directories in a list format. Its purpose as an alternative to using DOS commands is to facilitate moving files and directories. Task List displays all running applications and may also be used to terminate them, select a different program, cascade or tile the windows, and arrange minimized desktop icons. The Control Panel, where users can change settings to customize Windows and hardware, was also redesigned as an icon-based window.

The drivers bundled with Windows 3.0 support up to 16 simultaneous colors from EGA, MCGA or VGA palettes, as opposed to the previous maximum of eight colors, though the operating environment itself supports graphics adapters that offer resolutions and the number of colors greater than VGA. Windows 3.0 also introduced the Palette Manager, a set of functions that allow applications to change the lookup palette of graphics cards displaying up to 256 colors to use needed colors. When multiple displayed windows exceed the 256-color limit, Windows 3.0 prioritizes the active window to use that application's colors, without resorting to dithering and then filling in areas.

Windows 3.0 retains many of the simple applications from its predecessors, such as the text editor Notepad, the word processor Write, and the improved paint program Paintbrush. Calculator is expanded to include scientific calculations. Recorder is a new program that records macros, or sequences of keystrokes and mouse movements, which are then assigned to keys as shortcuts to perform complex functions quickly. Also, the earlier Reversi game was complemented with the card game Microsoft Solitaire, which would eventually be inducted into the World Video Game Hall of Fame in 2019. Another notable program is Help. Unlike DOS applications, which may have help functions as part of them, Windows Help is a separate and readily accessible application that accompanies all Windows programs that support it.

Updates
There are two updates known to have been published for Windows 3.0. One of them is Windows 3.0a, released in December 1990. It modified Windows' DOS extender—a program that enables DOS applications to access extended memory—to prevent errors caused by software calling into real-mode code when Windows is loaded in standard mode. It also simplified the installation process and alleviated crashes associated with networking, printing, and low-memory conditions.

Windows 3.0 with Multimedia Extensions

Windows 3.0 with Multimedia Extensions 1.0 (MME) was released to third-party manufacturers in October 1991. The application programming interface introduced Media Control Interface, designed for any media-related device such as graphics and audio cards, scanners, and videotape players. It also supported recording and playing digital audio, MIDI devices, screensavers and analog joysticks, as well as CD-ROM drives, which were then becoming increasingly available. Other features included additional applets such as an alarm clock and Media Player, used to run media files. MME supports stereo sound and 16-bit audio bit depth and sampling rates of up to 44.1 kHz.

System requirements
The official system requirements for Windows 3.0 and its substantial update, Windows 3.0 with Multimedia Extensions:

The processor and memory minimum requirements for the original version are those needed to run Windows in real mode, the lowest of the three operating modes. This mode severely limits the multitasking capabilities of Windows, although it can still use expanded memory, which is memory that is added by installing expanded memory boards or memory managers. However, it also provides backward compatibility with as many hardware and software designed for DOS as possible, and it may be used to run DOS applications and older Windows applications not optimized for Windows 3.0 if running them in higher operating modes is not possible. Standard mode requires at least an 80286 processor, and although the memory required is unchanged, the mode does allow the processor to use extended memory for running applications. 386 enhanced mode requires at least an 80386 processor and two megabytes of memory. While the other modes can run DOS applications in full-screen only and must suspend DOS applications to run Windows programs and vice versa, the DOS applications in 386 enhanced mode can be run windowed and concurrently with the Windows applications. Unlike the other modes, this one cannot be used to run DOS applications that use DOS extenders incompatible with DPMI specifications. Normally, Windows will start in the highest operating mode the computer can use, but the user may force it into lower modes by typing WIN /R or WIN /S at the DOS command prompt. If the user selects an operating mode that cannot be used due to lack of RAM or CPU support, Windows merely boots into the next lowest one.

Reception
Windows 3.0 is considered to be the first version of Windows to receive critical acclaim. Users and critics universally lauded its icon-based interface and the ensuing ease of performing operations, as well as the improved multitasking and greater control over customizing their environments. Computerworld considered the software to share the same benefits as OS/2 and Unix. Garry Ray of Lotus considered this version of Windows the first of the environment to bear "serious long-term consideration." Bill Howard of PC Magazine found its user interface to be easy to use, though not quite as intuitive as Macintosh. The editor of InfoWorld, Michael J. Miller, had faith that PC users would fully transition from the preceding text-only environment to the GUI with Windows 3.0 as their primary choice.

One critical aspect of Windows 3.0 is how it managed memory. Before its release, users of previous versions of Windows were burdened with trying to circumvent memory constraints to use those versions' touted capabilities. The Windows software occupied a large amount of memory, and users regularly experienced system slowdowns and often exceeded memory limits. Windows 3.0 also had relatively high memory requirements by 1990's standards, but with the three memory modes, it was praised for using memory more efficiently, removing the 640–kilobyte limit that had existed in computers running on Microsoft software since DOS, and supporting more powerful CPUs.

Ted Needleman of the computer magazine Modern Electronics called Windows 3.0's GUI "state-of-the-art" and compared Microsoft's previous attempts to produce such a GUI to Apple Lisa, Apple's early such attempt and the predecessor to its far more successful Macintosh. He cautioned about the seemingly cheap upgrade cost of US$50 when the system requirements and the need to upgrade any installed applications for compatibility are considered. He also cautioned that the software's advantages could be taken only by running Windows applications. However, in February 1991, PC Magazine noted a vast array of applications designed specifically for Windows 3.0, including many that had yet to be available for OS/2. It also cited two other factors leading to the operating environment's success: one of them was the inexpensive cost of the hardware needed to run it compared to the Macintosh, and the other was its focus on fully utilizing hardware components that were relatively powerful by its time's standards.

Amid the unprecedented success of Windows 3.0, Microsoft came under attack by critics as well as the United States Federal Trade Commission, who alleged that the company had attempted to dominate the applications market by luring its competitors into developing software for IBM's OS/2 while it was developing its own for Windows. At the time of Windows 3.0's release, Microsoft had only 10 and 15 percent of the market shares on spreadsheets and word processors, respectively, but those figures had risen to over 60 percent in 1995, overtaking previously dominant competitors such as Lotus Development Corporation and WordPerfect. Microsoft did indeed suggest developers to write applications for the OS/2, but it also intended Windows 3.0 to be a "low-end" alternative to the latter, with Gates referring to the OS/2 as the operating system of the 1990s. The Windows brand was also intended to be canceled after this version's release. The investigations into—and the eventual subsequent suing of—Microsoft led to a settlement on July 15, 1994, where Microsoft agreed not to bundle separate software packages with its operating products. It marked the first time that the company had ever been investigated for anticompetitive practices.

Sales
Windows 3.0 is also considered the first Windows to see commercial success. At the time of release, of the 40 million personal computers installed, only five percent used either previous version of Windows, but within its first week of availability, it rose as the top-selling business software. After six months, two million licenses were sold. Its success was interdependent with the PC industry, exemplified by an explosion of demand for and subsequent production of Intel's more powerful microprocessor, the 80486. Windows became so widely used in businesses that Brian Livingston of InfoWorld wrote in October 1991 that "a company with no PCs that run Windows is almost like a company without a fax machine." Microsoft had spent a total of $10 million in its marketing campaign for the software, including the $3 million for its release. When its successor, Windows 3.1, was released, sales totaled about 10 million licenses, and a year later the Windows series would overtake DOS as the bestselling application of all time.

Windows 3.0 is regarded in retrospect as a turning point in the future of Microsoft, being attributed to its later dominance in the operating system market and to the company's improved applications market share. The company used to have close ties with IBM since the former's inception, but the unexpected success of its new product would lead to the two companies recasting their relationship, where they would continue to sell each other's operating products until 1993. After the fiscal year of 1990, Microsoft reported revenues of US$1.18 billion, with $337 million appearing in the fourth quarter. This annual statistic is up from $803.5 million in fiscal 1989, and it made Microsoft the first microcomputer software company to reach the $1 billion mark in one year. Microsoft officials attributed the results to the sales of Windows 3.0.

References

Bibliography

External links
 Windows history: Windows 3.0 takes off , an article detailing a brief history of Windows 3.0

1990 software
DOS software
3.0
Products and services discontinued in 2001
History of Microsoft
History of software
Products introduced in 1990